Guo Dan (born 6 December 1990) is a Chinese female roller skater who is also specialised in speed skating. She took the sport of roller skating at the age of three and has competed at several international competitions as a roller skater. She most notably secured a gold medal in the women's 20000m elimination race during the 2013 World Games, which was held in Colombia.

Guo Dan decided to take the sport of speed skating in late 2015 as she was aiming to qualify for the 2018 Winter Olympics. She took part in the 2017 Asian Winter Games and competed in the women's mass start event. Guo Dan was selected to represent China at the 2018 Winter Olympics and competed in the women's mass start event.

References 

1990 births
Living people
Chinese female speed skaters
Inline speed skaters
World Games gold medalists
Speed skaters at the 2018 Winter Olympics
Speed skaters at the 2022 Winter Olympics
Olympic speed skaters of China
Speed skaters at the 2017 Asian Winter Games
Sportspeople from Beijing
Asian Games medalists in roller sports
Asian Games silver medalists for China
Roller skaters at the 2010 Asian Games
Roller skaters at the 2018 Asian Games
Medalists at the 2010 Asian Games
Medalists at the 2018 Asian Games
Competitors at the 2013 World Games
20th-century Chinese women
21st-century Chinese women